{ "type": "ExternalData", "service": "page", "title": "Western Australian region - South West.map" }

The South West region is one of the nine regions of Western Australia. It has an area of 23,970 km2, and a population of about 170,000 people. Bunbury is the main city in the region.

Climate
The South West has a Mediterranean climate, with dry summers and wet winters. There is about 900 mm of precipitation per year, with most between May and September. Mean maximum daily temperatures range from 16 °C in July to 34 °C in February.

Economy
The economy of the South West is very diverse. It is a major world producer of aluminium oxide and mineral sands, and also has substantial agriculture, timber, and viticulture industries. It is Western Australia's second-most popular tourist destination after Perth.

Local government divisions
The South West region consists of the following local government areas:
Shire of Augusta–Margaret River
Shire of Boyup Brook
Shire of Bridgetown–Greenbushes
City of Bunbury
City of Busselton
Shire of Capel
Shire of Collie
Shire of Dardanup
Shire of Donnybrook–Balingup
Shire of Harvey
Shire of Manjimup
Shire of Nannup

Attractions
Some well-known attractions include Cape Naturaliste Lighthouse and Discovery Centre, Ngilgi Cave, Augusta Jewel Cave, Cape Leeuwin Lighthouse, Mammoth Cave, Easter Cave, Bunbury Dolphin Discovery Centre, Dave Evans Bicentennial Tree, Diamond Tree, and Gloucester Tree.

References

External links
 South West Development Commission
 South West Business and Community Directory
 South West Life

 
Regions of Western Australia